Sleek is an adjective referring to shine and slenderness

Sleek may also refer to:
A 'sleek', or hairline scratch on sheet glass
Sleek Spur, coastal spur in Antarctica
Sleek (Dungeons & Dragons)

See also
Sleek the Elite, pseudonym for rapper Paul Nakad